The 2003 Finnish Figure Skating Championships took place between January 10 and 12, 2003 in Turku. Skaters competed in the disciplines of men's singles, women's singles, pair skating, and ice dancing on the senior and junior levels. The event was used to help determine the Finnish team to the 2003 European Championships.

Senior results

Men

Ladies

Pairs

Ice dancing

External links
 results

Finnish Figure Skating Championships, 2003
Finnish Figure Skating Championships
Figure Skating Championships
Finnish Figure Skating Championships
International sports competitions in Turku
Finnish Figure Skating Championships, 2003